Petersville (also Petersonville) is a ghost town in the town of Iola, Waupaca County, Wisconsin, United States.

Notes

Geography of Waupaca County, Wisconsin
Ghost towns in Wisconsin